David Rosenberg may refer to:
 David Rosenberg (curator), French art curator and author
 David Rosenberg (poet), American poet, biblical translator, editor, and educator
 David Alan Rosenberg, military historian

See also
 David I. Rozenberg, Soviet economist